AWA may refer to:
 AWA (singer) (born 1997), Swedish singer
 AWA Tower, office and communications complex in Sydney, Australia
 Awá (Brazil), an indigenous people of Brazil

Abbreviations 
 Aluminium wire armour, type of electrical cable
 Anarchism without adjectives, a school of anarchist thought
 Apparent wind angle, the angle of the wind experienced by a moving object
 Arctic World Archive, a data store on the island Svalbard, Norway
 Australian Web Archive, an online database of archived Australian websites

Companies and organizations 
 Advancing Women Artists Foundation, American not-for-profit organization restoring work by female artists in Florence, Italy
 Africa Wrestling Alliance, a wrestling organization
 Africa World Airlines, Ghanaian airline company
 Amalgamated Weavers' Association, former trade union in the United Kingdom
 America West Airlines, former United States major airline
 American Whitewater, not-for-profit organization to conserve and restore whitewater resources
 American Wrestling Association, a former wrestling organization
 American Writers Association, a literary organization
 Anarchist Workers Association, a British anarchist organization
 Anime Weekend Atlanta, an annual anime convention located in Georgia
 Australasian Women's Association (founded 1900), a Friendly Society
 AWA Technology Services, electronics manufacturer and broadcaster

Law 
 Adam Walsh Act, US federal statute that organizes sex offenders by crime
 All Writs Act, US federal statute which authorizes federal courts to issue writs
 Animal Welfare Act (disambiguation), several laws
 Australian workplace agreement, an employment contract

See also
 Awa (disambiguation)